John Van Schaick Lansing Pruyn (June 22, 1811 – November 21, 1877) was a lawyer, businessman and politician from Albany, New York. His business ventures included banking and railroads, often in partnership with longtime friend Erastus Corning, who was the uncle of Pruyn's first wife. Pruyn served in state and federal legislative offices, and was most notable for his terms as a United States representative from New York during the latter half of the American Civil War and the early days of Reconstruction.

Early life

Pruyn was born in Albany, New York on June 22, 1811, the son of David Pruyn and Hibertje Lansing Pruyn. His last name is pronounced to rhyme with "shine"  and he was of Dutch descent, with Van Schaick, Lansing and Pruyn all being prominent Dutch family names in upstate New York. Pruyn pursued classical studies and graduated from The Albany Academy in 1826. He studied law with Albany attorney James King, was admitted to the bar in 1832, and commenced practice in Albany.

In addition to practicing law, Pruyn was successful in several business ventures, often in partnership with Erastus Corning, who was the uncle of Pruyn's first wife.  His business interests included the Albany City Bank, of which Pruyn was an incorporator and the longtime vice president.  In addition, he helped organize the New York Central Railroad system, and was one of its main shareholders.

Later career
Pruyn was elected a member of the Albany Institute in 1831, and served as president from 1857 until his death. He was appointed a regent of the University of the State of New York in 1844, and served as chancellor from 1868 until his death.  Pruyn was also a founding trustee of St. Stephen's College, which was later renamed Bard College. In addition, he served on the New York State Board of Charities and on the commission that designed and built the New York State Capitol. Pruyn had the honor of laying the new capitol's first stone, which he did in an 1869 ceremony that included Governor John T. Hoffman and other prominent dignitaries.

Pruyn received the honorary degree of Master of Arts from Rutgers College in 1835.  He received an honorary Master of Arts from Union College in 1845, and an honorary LL.D. from the University of Rochester in 1852.

Pruyn was a member of the New York State Senate (13th D.) in 1862 and 1863. He was elected as a Democrat to the 38th United States Congress, to fill the vacancy caused by the resignation of Erastus Corning, holding office from December 7, 1863, to March 3, 1865.  Like Corning, Pruyn was a pro-Union Democrat who supported the war effort because he believed that states did not have the right to secede.  Like many pro-Union Democrats, Pruyn also argued that in prosecuting the war, Abraham Lincoln's administration sometimes overstepped its authority with regard to individual liberties and civil rights.

Pruyn was elected to the 40th United States Congress, holding office from March 4, 1867, to March 3, 1869. Afterwards he resumed his law practice and business interests.

Pruyn was a stockholder in the Central Pacific Railroad and a director of the Union Pacific Railroad.  In his 1867 to 1869 term he was revealed to be one of the members of Congress who had received stock in the Crédit Mobilier.  During the subsequent scandal and investigation, his name appeared on lists of Congressmen who owned shares, but records showed he had paid for his stock.  He was never accused of receiving it as a bribe, or of committing any wrongdoing.

Death and burial
Pruyn died in Clifton Springs, New York on November 21, 1877. He was buried at Albany Rural Cemetery in Menands, New York.

Family

On October 22, 1840 Pruyn married Harriet Corning Turner (June 18, 1822 – March 22, 1859), the niece of Erastus Corning. They had six children, two of whom - Erastus Corning Pruyn and John V. L. Pruyn, Jr. - lived to adulthood.

After the death of his first wife Pruyn married Anna Fenn Parker (March 26, 1840 – October 7, 1909), the daughter of Amasa J. Parker. They had two daughters, Harriet Langdon Pruyn and Huybertje (also spelled Huybertie or Hibertje) Lansing Pruyn.

Erastus Corning Pruyn (August 24, 1841 – February 1, 1881) was an agent of the United States Department of State in Caracas, Venezuela in the 1860s and traveled extensively as a student and businessman.  He died in Tenerife.

John V. L. Pruyn, Jr. (March 14, 1859 – September 22, 1904) graduated from Union College in 1880 and practiced law in Albany.

Harriet Langdon Pruyn (January 31, 1868 – July 3, 1939) was the wife of William Gorham Rice.  Rice was an aide to Governor Samuel Tilden and President Grover Cleveland, and succeeded Theodore Roosevelt as a member of the United States Civil Service Commission. In addition to being active in Albany civic and philanthropic causes, Harriet Langdon Pruyn was the author of a biography, 1924's Harmanus Bleecker: an Albany Dutchman, 1779-1849.  (John V. L. Pruyn and Amasa J. Parker had been involved in the disposition of Bleecker's estate, which gave Harriet Pruyn access to Bleecker's papers.)

Huybertje Lansing Pruyn (April 8, 1878—March 6, 1964) was the wife of Charles Sumner Hamlin. She was the author of Memories of an Albany Girlhood (also published as An Albany Girlhood).

Pruyn's extended family included cousin Robert H. Pruyn, a prominent lawyer, militia general, diplomat, and politician.

References

External links

 Retrieved on 2009-05-13

1811 births
1877 deaths
American people of Dutch descent
Politicians from Albany, New York
New York (state) lawyers
Democratic Party members of the United States House of Representatives from New York (state)
People of New York (state) in the American Civil War
Democratic Party New York (state) state senators
Burials at Albany Rural Cemetery
19th-century American politicians
Lawyers from Albany, New York
The Albany Academy alumni
19th-century American lawyers
Lansing family
Pruyn family
Corning family